Transverse muscle may refer to:

 Transverse abdominal muscle
 Transverse muscle of tongue
 Transverse muscle of the chin, a facial muscle
 Transverse perineal muscles
 Deep transverse perineal muscle
 Superficial transverse perineal muscle